Koko Ari Araya (born 9 January 2000) is an Indonesian professional footballer who plays as a right back for Liga 1 club Persebaya Surabaya and the Indonesia national team.

Club career

Persebaya Surabaya
Koko Ari debuted for Persebaya in the 2019 Liga 1 season. However, he became recognized in the 2020 Piala Gubernur Jatim tournament, a pre-season competition ahead of the 2020 Liga 1 season, after he was instrumental in the club's successes in winning the trophy. His performance there caught the eye of Indonesian national football team coach Shin Tae-yong who has called him to join senior team training since 2020.

International career
Koko Ari received a call to join the senior Indonesia team for the 2022 FIFA World Cup qualification in June 2021.

On 1 June 2022, Koko Ari earned his first senior cap in a friendly match against Bangladesh that ended 0-0.

Career statistics

Club

Notes

International

Honours

Club
Persebaya Surabaya U-20
 Elite Pro Academy U-20: 2019

Persebaya Surabaya
 East Java Governor Cup: 2020

References

External links
 Koko Ari Araya at Soccerway
 Koko Ari Araya at Liga Indonesia

2000 births
Living people
Indonesian footballers
People from Surabaya
Sportspeople from East Java
Sportspeople from Surabaya
Association football defenders
Liga 1 (Indonesia) players
Persebaya Surabaya players
Indonesia international footballers
21st-century Indonesian people